Martin Henderson (born 8 October 1974) is a New Zealand actor. He is known for his roles on the American medical drama series Off the Map as Dr. Ben Keeton (2011), the medical drama series Grey's Anatomy as Dr. Nathan Riggs (2015–2017), the Netflix romantic drama Virgin River as Jack Sheridan (2019–present), and for his performance as Noah Clay in the 2002 horror film The Ring, while remaining known in his home country for his teenage role as Stuart Neilson in the soap opera Shortland Street (1992–1995).

Early life
Henderson was born in Auckland, and began acting at the age of thirteen, appearing in Strangers, a local television production. He attended Birkenhead Primary Northcote Intermediate and  Westlake Boys High schools. He turned down going to study at university when he was 17, in favour of acting.

Career
Henderson starred as Stuart Neilson in the New Zealand prime-time soap opera Shortland Street from 1992 to 1995. He subsequently appeared in a number of Australian films and television productions including Echo Point and Home and Away, before moving to the United States in 1997, to pursue a career in Hollywood films and to train in a two-year program at the Neighborhood Playhouse in New York City.

In 1999, he appeared in Kick, for which he was nominated for an AACTA Award for Best Actor in a Supporting Role in 2000. After more than a year unsuccessfully auditioning for film roles in Los Angeles, in 2001 he was cast in a supporting role in the John Woo-directed war film Windtalkers.
In 2002, Henderson starred opposite Naomi Watts in the horror film The Ring. Following the box office success of the film, he was cast as Drew in Perfect Opposites, and subsequently as the lead character in the biker film Torque, released in early 2004. Later that year, he starred opposite Aishwarya Rai in the British romantic film Bride and Prejudice and appeared in Britney Spears' "Toxic" music video. In 2005, he appeared in the award-winning Little Fish starring Cate Blanchett. In 2006, Henderson received rave reviews in London's West End in a theatre production of Fool for Love with Juliette Lewis.

He was set to star alongside Jordana Brewster in the television series adapted from the 2005 film Mr. & Mrs. Smith. However, the series was not picked up by any network. In 2006, he appeared in the movie Flyboys. He also appeared in a commercial for the 2008 Cadillac CTS, and the House episode "Painless". In 2010, Henderson was cast in Grey's Anatomy creator Shonda Rhimes' short-lived television series Off the Map.  In 2014, he starred in the multi-platform Australian drama television series Secrets & Lies and in the SundanceTV drama series The Red Road.

In 2015, Henderson appeared in Everest, with Jake Gyllenhaal. In June that year Deadline reported that he would join Grey's Anatomy starting in November, as a potential love interest for series lead Ellen Pompeo's Meredith Grey. The actor exited two years later, his final appearance in October 2017. Henderson told Deadline that his departure was a storytelling-based decision, adding, "This [was] my final year so I was expecting Nathan’s storyline to be wrapped up."

Since 2019, Henderson has co-starred on the Netflix series Virgin River playing the role of Jack Sheridan, a former marine with PTSD. The series was renewed by Netflix for a fourth and fifth season in 2021.

He was cast in A24 horror film X (2022) as Wayne Gilroy.

Personal life
As of 2017, he lives in Los Angeles with his dog.

Filmography

Film

Television

Web series

Music videos

References

External links
 

1974 births
21st-century New Zealand male actors
20th-century New Zealand male actors
Living people
New Zealand male child actors
New Zealand male film actors
New Zealand male soap opera actors
New Zealand male television actors
People educated at Westlake Boys High School
People from Auckland